was a Japanese daimyō of the Sengoku period, who was famed as the head of the Takeda clan and the successor to the legendary warlord Takeda Shingen. He was son in law of Hojo Ujiyasu.

Early life
He was the son of Shingen by the daughter of Suwa Yorishige (posthumous name:). Katsuyori's children included Takeda Nobukatsu and Katsuchika.

After his elder brother Takeda Yoshinobu died, Katsuyori's son Nobukatsu became heir to the Takeda clan, making Katsuyori the true ruler of the Takeda clan. 
Takeda Katsuyori built Shinpu Castle, a new and larger castle at Nirasaki and transferred his residence there in 1581.

Military life
In 1569, Katsuyori defeated Hojo Ujinobu at Siege of Kanbara

In 1572, Katsuyori successfully took a Tokugawa clan possession in the Siege of Futamata, and participated in the Battle of Mikatagahara against the Oda-Tokugawa alliance.

In 1573, Katsuyori took charge of the Takeda family after the death of Shingen and fought the Tokugawa clan.

In 1574, he captured Takatenjin castle, which even his father had not managed to do. This gained him the support of the Takeda clan.

In 1575, he suffered a terrible loss at the Battle of Nagashino, defeated by one of the earliest recorded uses of volley fire (by Oda Nobunaga's 3,000 guns), and losing a large part of his forces as well as a number of Takeda's generals.

In 1578, Katsuyori incurred the wrath of the Hōjō family by helping Uesugi Kagekatsu against Uesugi Kagetora who was Hōjō Ujiyasu's seventh son, adopted by and heir to Uesugi Kenshin, that initiated the Battle of Omosu in 1580 against Hojo Ujimasa.

In 1581, Katsuyori lost Takatenjin fortress by Tokugawa Ieyasu, the siege ended with the deaths of 680 men of Okabe Motonobu garrison.

In 1582, Katsuyori lost Takatō castle by Oda Nobutada, the only Takeda stronghold in Shinano province to put up any resistance to Nobunaga's final invasion of Takeda domain, the castle was taken on March the 2nd 1582.

Death

After Katsuyori lost Takatenjin fortress and Takatō castle, many clans like Kiso and Anayama withdrew their support for Takeda. The Oda-Tokugawa alliance advanced into Kai Province, and laid siege to Shinpu Castle, Katsuyori was unable to hold the castle with his remaining 300-400 men, so he set fire to Shinpu Castle and fled into the Tenmoku mountain. Later, his forces were destroyed by the combined armies of Oda Nobunaga and Tokugawa Ieyasu at the Battle of Tenmokuzan, after which Katsuyori, his wife, and his son committed ritual suicide, known as seppuku. It was the end of Takeda clan.

The nun Rikei wrote an account of his wife's suicide and, pitying them, wrote several verses in their honour.

Spouse

Toyama Fujin 
Takeda Katsuyori married Toyoma Fujin, the adopted daughter of Oda Nobunaga. She died while giving birth to their son Nobukatsu in 1567.

Hojo Masako 
Katsuyori later married Hojo Masako, daughter of Hojo Ujiyasu. She bore him a son and two daughters. In 1582, when Masako was 19, Katsuyori was defeated by Oda Nobunaga and they had to flee. However, Katsuyori was resigned to die and urged her to leave him. She refused and killed herself (jigai), along with Katsuyori in the Battle of Tenmokuzan. Both of his sons died in the battle.

Family
Father: Takeda Shingen (1521–1573)

Sons:
 Takeda Nobukatsu (1567–1582)
 Takeda Katsuchika (1580–1582)

Wives:
 Toyama Fujin
 Hojo Masako

Daughters:
 Tei-hime, married Miyahara Yoshihisa
 Kougu-hime, married Naitō Tadaoki

References

Further reading 
 
Takeda Katsuyori no Saiki (in Japanese)
Yamanashi Prefecture page on Takeda Katsuyori (in Japanese)
Shibatsuji Shunroku 柴辻俊六 and Hirayama Masaru 平山優. Takeda Katsuyori no Subete 武田勝頼のすべて. Tokyo: Shin Jinbutsu Ōraisha 新人物往来社, 2007.
Shibatsuji Shunroku 柴辻俊六, Takeda Katsuyori 武田勝頼. Tokyo: Shin Jinbutsu Ōraisha 新人物往来社, 2003.

1546 births
1582 deaths
Daimyo
Takeda clan
Suicides by seppuku